Mirza Alakbar Sabir; born Alakbar Zeynalabdin oglu Tahirzadeh (30 May 1862, in Shamakhy – 12 July 1911, in Shamakhy) was an Azerbaijani satirical poet, public figure, philosopher and teacher. He set up a new attitude to classical traditions, rejecting well-trodden ways in poetry.

The artistic thought of the Azerbaijani people found expression in Fuzûlî's works. They have been examples of the lyric to this day, and the satirical trend in Azerbaijani literature, and especially in poetry.

Life 
Mirza Alakbar Sabir was born on May 30, 1862 in Shamakhi into a poor family. At that time the religion Islam dominated in the society. His mother, Saltanat, was a religious Muslim. His father Zeynalabdin Tahirzadeh was a merchant. He had 7 sisters and a brother. He received his primary education in a theological school. Sabir was brought up in a patriarchal-religious atmosphere. In 1874, when he was twelve years old, Alakbar entered the school of Seyid Azim Shirvani, a poet and teacher, where unlike traditional schools, general education subjects, as well as the Azerbaijani and Russian languages were taught. At that time, this school was considered very progressive. Personal contacts with this man greatly influenced the formation of Sabir as a poet. Encouraged by Seyid Azim, Sabir began translating Persian poetry and wrote poems in Azerbaijani.

On April 11, 1908, the poet, who took exams at the Spiritual Department of the Baku Province, went to Tiflis and received a diploma for a mother tongue and a Shariah teacher from the Caucasian Sheikh-ul-Islam Office. However, after a letter he received from Gori, he worked for some time as an assistant teacher in a Shamakhi school.

In September of that year, Sabir was able to open "Umid" school. There were about 60 students in this school. As in other new schools, students are sitting on the bench, using visual aids, and taking short excursions. At the school, the mother tongue, the Persian language, geography, and nature, as well as the Quran and Sharia lessons were taught.

Mirza Alekper Sabir died July 12, 1911, in the prime of his creative power. Sabir was buried in his hometown of Shamakhi in the cemetery "Yeddi Gumbez" ("Seven domes"), at the foot of the hill.

Throughout all his life poverty impacted Sabir. He was bound to take care of his family's welfare, barely earning a living for himself and his household. No time was left for literary activity, the more so as the spectre of poverty took more and more distinct shape. Sabir tried to become a merchant but did not succeed. Instead, he travelled a lot about Central Asia and the Middle East.

Career 
Mirza Alakbar Sabir wrote his first poem when he was eight years old. His works reflected both positive and negative features of life in Azerbaijan. In the early years, he wrote only lyrical ghazals, elegy, laudatory and mourning poems. His first work was printed in 1903 in the newspaper "Shargi-Rus" ("Russian East"). Between 1903 and 1905, Sabir collaborated in several newspapers and magazines such as "Debistan" (Sad School), "Zenbur" (Ovod), "Irshad" (Guide), "Hagigat" and "Hayat" (Life).

In 1900, after studying abroad, the modern-minded young poet Abbas Sahhat returned to Shamakhi, in whose house the local intelligentsia often gathered. Sabir attracted the attention of Abbas Sahhat and they began a close friendship that lasted until the death of Sabir. Abbas Sahhat, appreciating Sabir's talent, always encouraged and supported him.

The Russian Revolution of 1905 had a powerful effect on Sabir's writing, infusing it with a revolutionary spirit. This revolution, which was followed by the spreading of democratic trends throughout the Russian Empire, marked the beginning of a new era in Sabir's literary activity. The shock waves of upheaval brought about a host of satirical publications. The most prominent of them was the Molla Nasraddin magazine, which was popular all over the Caucasus, Middle East and Central Asia, its publisher being Jalil Mammadguluzadeh. Sabir's best, most creative mature years are associated with this publication. His pen did not miss a single political event, a single problem typical for the still the feudal-patriarchal Azerbaijani society and he embodied his ideas in stirring, thought-provoking images. He took an active part in the activity of the journal, exposing the negative sites of the society in his poems, passionately condemning the behaviour and actions of the rich people. He wrote about the arbitrariness of Tsarist officials, landowners and beys ignorant to their people, the backwardness of the clergy, the down-trodden status of women and the social situation of the working people.

Sabir contributed significantly to the revolutionary movement in Iran and Turkey between 1905 and 1910. In his poems, he caustically criticized the regime of Sultan Abdul-Hamid and Mohammed Ali Shah. Realism, socio-political lyricism and keen satire - these are the main elements that characterize the work of Sabir, who played a revolutionizing role in educating the young generation.

Sabir's poetry won him the people's respect and popularity, at the same time, placing him in a very risky and dangerous position. He was exposed to persecution, attacks and insults of the officials, mullahs and qochus (bouncers), who threatened him with reprisals. That's why Sabir (this pen-name means patience) had more than fifty pen-names such as Mirat, Fazil, Aglar-Guleghen and others. But even this could not help him escape from persecution. One of his earliest pseudonyms was “Hop-Hop”, which means the name of a type of bird.

For the first time in Azerbaijani literature, Sabir’s social satires raised the issue of class oppression. The political satires reflected the dispersal of the State Duma in Russia, the intrigues of autocracy against the liberation movement in the countries of the Middle East, the intrigues of international reaction. In social satires, “What do we need?”, “Crying”, “Beggar”, “What do I have to do?”, “Complaint of the old man” and others, Sabir, for the first time in the Azerbaijani literature, raised the question of inequality in society.

Poverty, overstrain, endless cares of his large family and persecution adversely affected his health. He boiled soap for a living and was often ill. In 1910 Sabir's liver disease took a serious turn that turned out to be irreversible. Even when ill, Sabir continued to write. Not long before his death, he said to his friends who stood at his bedside: "I laid my flesh down for my people. But if God would give me more time, I would lay my bones down too..."

Hophopname 
After his death, in honour of Sabir's memory, his wife Bullurnise, and his friends Abbas Sahhat and M. Mahmudbeyov collected Sabir`s poems and published them under the name "Hophopname" in 1912. Two years later, the second, better edition of the “Hophopname” was released by the people. Using a wide range of expressive means, some of which were introduced by him to Azerbaijani poetry for the first time, Sabir made a gallery of social types of carriers of various vices of ignorance, inertia, and moneymakers who betrayed the interests of the people in this book.

Sabir’s poems, his caustic epigrams, verbal self-character portraits appeared on the pages of Molla Nasreddin magazine with colorful illustrations by the artist Azim Azimzade and became the property of an international reader, as the magazine was received in the cities of Russia, Iran, Afghanistan, Egypt, India, and other countries.

See also
House-Museum of Mirza Alakbar Sabir

References

External links
Encyclopaedia Iranica. Ṣāber, Mirzā Ali-Akbar Ṭāherzāda

1862 births
1911 deaths
Azerbaijani-language poets
Azerbaijani satirists
People from Shamakhi
People of the Persian Constitutional Revolution
Lyric poets
Translators from Persian